Ulises Blanch (born 25 March 1998) is an American professional tennis player.

As a junior, Blanch reached a career high ranking of World No. 2 achieved on 23 May 2016. His junior highlights include a final appearance at the Trofeo Bonfiglio, a GA event in Milan, Italy as well as winning a few Grade 1 level events in Brazil and Australia.

Blanch was born in San Juan, Puerto Rico, but his family moved to Seattle when he was just 3 days old. Due to his father's job, Blanch has lived in multiple countries such as China, India, Thailand and Argentina. Ulises has two brothers and one sister. Dali, Darwin, and Krystal Blanch. All four of them play tennis and have won numerous tournaments.

Blanch has reached 6 career singles finals with a record of 3 wins and 3 losses which includes a 2–0 record in ATP Challenger finals. In July 2018, he won the Perugia Challenger tournament in Italy, defeating Italian Gianluigi Quinzi in the final 7–5, 6–2.  A year and a half later, he won the 2020 Ann Arbor Challenger in Michigan, USA  defeating Roberto Cid Subervi of the Dominican Republic 3–6, 6–4, 6–2 to capture the championship. Additionally, Blanch has reached 3 career doubles finals with a record of 2 wins and 1 loss, all coming at the ITF Futures level.

Blanch made his ATP Tour main draw debut at the 2020 US Open where he was granted a direct entry into the singles draw via wild card. He was defeated in the first round in a five-set thrilling match despite taking a two sets to love lead, by Chilean player Cristian Garín 6–4, 7–5, 4–6, 4–6, 2–6.

ATP Challenger and ITF Futures finals

Singles: 6 (3–3)

Doubles: 3 (2–1)

References

External links
 
 

1998 births
Living people
American male tennis players
Sportspeople from San Juan, Puerto Rico